Calosoma semilaeve, the black calosoma, is a species of ground beetle in the subfamily Carabinae. It was described by John Lawrence LeConte in 1851.

References

semilaeve
Beetles described in 1851